Zhang Xiaoyu (born March 16, 1983, in Beijing) is a female  shot putter from PR China. She won the event at the 2004 Asian Indoor Athletics Championships, which were first held that year.  She finished 20th in the Women's shot put at the 2004 Olympics.

Achievements

References
sports-reference.com

1983 births
Living people
Athletes (track and field) at the 2004 Summer Olympics
Chinese female shot putters
Olympic athletes of China
Athletes from Beijing
21st-century Chinese women